Haxton is a surname. Notable people with the surname include: 

Brooks Haxton (born 1950), American poet and translator
Elaine Haxton (1909–1999), Australian artist
Fred Haxton (1879–1933), English football player
Gerald Haxton (1892–1944), long-term secretary and lover of W. Somerset Maugham
Isaac Haxton (born 1985), American poker player
Kelly Haxton (born 1982), Canadian football player
Wick Haxton (born 1949), American nuclear physicist and astrophysicist